GBR or GbR may refer to:

Organisations
 GbR, a form of business entity in Germany
 General Botha Regiment, an infantry regiment of the South African Army
 Great Britain at the Olympics (Team GB), by IOC country code
 Great British Railways, a planned British railway body

Places
 Great Barrier Reef, off the coast of Queensland, Australia
 Great Bear Rainforest, British Columbia, Canada
 United Kingdom, by ISO 3166-1 code
 Walter J. Koladza Airport (or Great Barrington Airport), United States (by IATA code)

Science and technology
 GBR (subpixels) (Green, Blue, Red), an RGB display pixel layout
 GBR compound, nomenclature code for a series of molecular drugs that are congeners with benztropine
 Gerber format, a file format with extension gbr
 Guaranteed Bit Rate, a characteristic of LTE network traffic flows
 Guided bone regeneration, a medical procedure

See also
 BGR (disambiguation)
 RGB (disambiguation)